World Relief (officially, World Relief Corporation of National Association of Evangelicals) is an Evangelical Christian humanitarian nongovernmental organization, the humanitarian arm of the National Association of Evangelicals and a leading refugee resettlement agency.

The administrative headquarters is in Baltimore, Maryland. There are 17 regional offices throughout the United States and 9 international offices.

History 
World Relief was founded as a Commission in 1944 by the National Association of Evangelicals to send clothing and food to victims of World War II. After the war, evangelical leaders decided that the War Relief Commission should continue working in post-war Europe and around the world. In 1950, the agency was renamed World Relief and began to focus on other areas of development, providing sewing machines and training so war widows could earn a living, setting up TB clinics, and supporting orphanages and land reclamation projects.

World Relief is organized as a corporation, and the National Association of Evangelicals as the sole shareholder. Myal Greene is currently the President/CEO (2021-Present).

Programs

International Programs 
World Relief's core programs focus on microfinance, AIDS prevention and care, maternal and child health, child development, agricultural training, disaster response, refugee resettlement and immigrant services.

U.S. Programs 
World Relief currently has 17 regional offices (some with multiple locations) throughout the United States, which provide refugee resettlement and immigrant services.

Refugee Resettlement Program 
One of the functions of World Relief is their refugee resettlement program. There are currently more refugees in the world than there ever has been since World War II, and World Relief aims to help those affected by crises around the world.

World Relief aims to help refugees as soon as a refugee and their families are forced to flee their home, starting by providing essentials to the families, such as clean water and food. World Relief then tries to help the refugees regain potential lost hope and hopefully grow even further by offering family strengthening programs. World Relief also seeks to help refugees find an affordable home and find a job. Because World Relief is headquartered in the United States, World Relief also tries to help refugees learn English, if they do not know it already. Since 1979, World Relief has successfully relocated and supported over 300,000 refugees in the United States.

World Relief uses the definition of refugee from international law. International law defines a refugee as someone who flees their state for fear of being persecuted for one or more of five traits: "their race, religion, nationality, political opinion, or membership in a particular social group."

Refugees Resettled by World Relief 

 Clemantine Wamariya, author of The Girl Who Smiled Beads: A Story About War and What Comes After

Finances
The majority of World Relief's income comes from government grants. World Relief also receives income from private grants, contributions, travel loan commissions, client fees, consulting contracts, banking revenue, rent, and sales of assets.

World Relief awarded approximately $11 million of grants and other assistance during fiscal year 2018. It also spent approximately $33 million in compensation of its employees.

World Relief's net worth was $16 million as of September 30, 2018.

Leadership
 Myal Greene, President/CEO (2021-Present)
 Tim Breene, former Chief Executive Officer
 Scott Arbeiter, former President
 Kevin Sanderson, Chief Administrative Officer, Chief Financial Officer
 Steve Moore, Chairperson
 Kathy Vaselkiv, Vice Chair
 Bill Westrate, Treasurer
 Rev. Dr. Casely Essamuah, Secretary

References

External links
 

Emergency organizations
Evangelical parachurch organizations
International charities
Microfinance organizations
Poverty-related organizations
Health charities in the United States
Religious organizations based in the United States
Medical and health organizations based in Maryland
Humanitarian aid organizations
Refugee aid organizations in the United States
Christian refugee aid organizations
Christian humanitarian aid organizations
Christian charities
Christian relief organizations